Calvin Brock (born in 1986) is an American professional basketball player from Chicago, Illinois. Brock played star high school ball at  Simeon Career Academy of the Chicago Public League. He was a member of the National Honor Society. Leading the Simeon team to the 2004 state Class AA quarterfinals, Brock become a Tribune First-Team All-State selection. He was called “the Public League's best all-around player...Averaged 22 points, 10 rebounds, 5 steals, 4 assists and 4 blocks”

College career
In 2005 he began playing college ball at the University of Illinois wearing number 25, to honor the late Benjamin "Benji" Wilson Jr., as have other Simeon basketball alumni, Nick Anderson and Deon Thomas. In his junior year he scored 258 total points. For his senior year as the sixth man, Brock averaged 4.9 points and 3.0 rebounds in 16.7 minutes per game. He received his bachelor's degree (BS) in sports management.

Professional career
When Brock was not drafted by a National Basketball Association (NBA) team, he began his pro career in Germany. In 2012, after three seasons of playing professional basketball in Europe, he tore the LCL in his right knee. Back in Chicago for rehab, thoughts of coaching are on his mind.

References

External links 

 

Living people
1986 births
African-American basketball players
Illinois Fighting Illini men's basketball players
Basketball players from Chicago
American men's basketball players
Forwards (basketball)
21st-century African-American sportspeople
20th-century African-American people